Computec Media GmbH is a German computer media company headquartered in Fürth. It is a subsidiary of the Swiss Marquard Media Group. The company publishes multiple magazines and websites related to computers, video gaming and media.

History 
Computec Media was founded in 1989 by Christian Geltenpoth who led the company until 2005. In 1999, the company tried to establish itself in the United States but had to cancel its operations after only ten months.

From 1998 to 2013, it was traded in the General Standard of the Frankfurt stock exchange. In 2005, the Swiss Marquard Media AG became the company's major stock holder and on 1 October 2013 it bought the remaining stocks via a squeeze-out. Computec Media was delisted and transformed into a GmbH. In 2014 the company bought the Linux- and Raspberry-Pi-related magazines of  Medialinx and in 2016 the mobile phone news website  Areamobile.de.

Computec Media was the publisher of a number of now-defunct magazines, such as SEGA Magazin, PC Action, Play Time, Amiga Games, Mega Fun and XBG Games.

Subsidiaries 

 Golem Media GmbH Berlin, Germany

Publications 
 Buffed
 Games Aktuell
 gamesworld.de
 gamezone.de
 Golem.de
 Linux-Magazin
 LinuxUser
 N-Zone
 PC Games
 PC Games MMORE
 PC Games Hardware
 Play⁵
 Raspberry Pi Geek
 videogameszone.de

References

External links 
 Computec Media
 Marquard Media AG

1989 establishments in West Germany
Publishing companies of Germany
Companies based in Bavaria
German companies established in 1989